David Wellington may refer to:

 David Wellington (author), American author
 David Wellington (director), Canadian film director
 David Wellington (Homeland), fictional character